Linden is a surname commonly of Dutch, English and German origin. For the Swedish surname, see Lindén.

Some notable people with the surname include:
 Alan Linden (1917–1956), Australian athlete in Australian Rules football
 Allen Linden (b. 1934), Canadian jurist
 Andreas Linden (b. 1965), German athlete in Olympic javelin
 Andy Linden (actor) (fl. 1990s–present), British actor
 Andy Linden (racing driver) (1922–1987), American racecar driver
 Anya Linden (b. 1933), British ballerina
 Bob Linden (fl. 2000s-present),  American radio personality and entrepreneur
 Colin Linden (b. 1960), Canadian musician
 David Linden (b. 1961),  American neuroscientist and author
 Debbie Linden (1961–1997), British model and actress
 Donald Linden (1885-1965), Canadian athlete in Olympic walking
 Eddie Linden (b. 1935), British-Irish poet and magazine editor
 Edward Linden (1891-1956),  American cinematographer
 Eric Linden (1909–1994),  American actor
 Errol Linden (1937–1983), American football player
 Eugene Linden (author) (fl. 1980s-present), American author of technical and scientific books
 Eugene Linden (conductor) (f. 1930s), American musical conductor
 Hal Linden (b. 1931), American actor
 Jaap ter Linden (b. 1947), Dutch musician and conductor
 James Linden (fl. 1920s), American football coach
 Jamie Linden (ice hockey) (b. 1972), Canadian athlete in ice hockey
 Jamie Linden (writer) (b. 1980), American screenwriter 
 Jean Jules Linden (1817–1898), Belgian botanist and explorer, father of Lucien
 Jennie Linden (b. 1939), English actress
 Jürgen Linden (b. 1947), German politician
 Kathy Linden (fl. 1950s), American singer of popular music 
 Lucien Linden (1851-1940), Belgian botanist, son of Jean Jules
 Marta Linden (1903-1990), American actress
 Michael Linden (b. 1948), German neurologist and professor of psychiatry
 Mick Linden (fl. 2000s-present), Scottish musician
 Mickey Linden (fl. 1980-2000), Irish Gaelic footballer
 Paddy Linden (b. 1954/1955), Irish Gaelic footballer
 Sophie Linden (b. 1970), British politician
 Stella Linden (1919-2005), British-born British and American actress and playwright
 Todd Linden (b. 1980), American baseball player
 Trevor Linden (b. 1970), Canadian ice hockey player

See also 
 Linden (given name)
 Linden (disambiguation)
 Van der Linden, surname
 Van der Linde, surname
 Linnaeus (disambiguation)

Swedish-language surnames